Marie Eileen Albright [Lockhart] (March 25, 1928 – May 9, 2009) was an infielder and pitcher who played in the All-American Girls Professional Baseball League. Albright batted left-handed and threw right-handed. She was born in Wollaston, Quincy, Massachusetts.

Little is known about this player who appeared in a few games in an AAGPBL season. Albright joined the league's traveling team in 1948 in order to develop her skills and be placed on one of the expansion teams for that season. Basically, she played at second and third bases and pitched as well. She obtained the job and was assigned to the Chicago Colleens, who along with the Springfield Sallies joined as expansion teams for the 1948 season.

Albright pitched primarily for the Colleens and started four games, which were all losses. As a hitter, she posted a .141 average.

By the end of 1948, the Colleens and Sallies lost their franchises based on their awful debuts. For the next two years the Colleens and Sallies became rookie training teams.

Career statistics
Batting 

Pitching

Fielding

History facts
During the early 1940s the AAGPBL recruited young women to play baseball to keep the spirit of the game alive while the men fought overseas. The league, created in 1943 by the Chicago Cubs' owner Philip K. Wrigley, gave over 600 women athletes the opportunity to play professional baseball and to play it at a level never before attained. The AAGPBL folded in 1954, but there is now a permanent display at the Baseball Hall of Fame and Museum since November 5,  that honors those who were part of this unforgettable experience. Eileen Albright, along with the rest of the AAGPBL players, is now enshrined in the venerable building at Cooperstown, New York.
In 1992, filmmaker Penny Marshall premiered her film  A League of Their Own, which was a fictionalized account of activities in the All-American Girls Professional Baseball League. Starring Geena Davis, Tom Hanks, Madonna, Lori Petty and Rosie O'Donnell, this film brought a rejuvenated interest to the extinct AAGPBL. Many baseball historians consider the league's players as pioneers of an important movement which has eventually brought women's athletics to the prominent place it occupies in the 21st century.

Sources
Marie Eileen Lockhart – Profile / Obituary All-American Girls Professional Baseball League. Retrieved 2019-04-10.
All-American Girls Professional Baseball League Record Book – W. C. Madden. Publisher: McFarland & Company, 2000. Format: Hardcover, 294pp. 
Encyclopedia of Women and Baseball – Leslie A. Heaphy, Mel Anthony May. Publisher: McFarland & Company, 2006. Format: Softcover, 438pp. 
The Women of the All-American Girls Professional Baseball League: A Biographical Dictionary – W. C. Madden. Publisher:  McFarland & Company, 2005. Format: Softcover, 295 pp. 

All-American Girls Professional Baseball League players
Chicago Colleens players
Baseball infielders
Sportspeople from Quincy, Massachusetts
Baseball players from Massachusetts
1928 births
2009 deaths
20th-century American women
20th-century American people
21st-century American women